CFAP-DT, virtual channel 2.1 (UHF digital channel 35), is a Noovo owned-and-operated television station licensed to Quebec City, Quebec, Canada. The station is owned by the Bell Media subsidiary of BCE Inc. CFAP-DT's studios are located on the corner of Rue d'Youville and Rue Saint-Joachim (co-located with sister stations CHIK-FM and CITF-FM) in the Quebec City borough of La Cité-Limoilou, and its transmitter is located at Édifice Marie-Guyart, in downtown Quebec City. On cable, the station is available on Vidéotron channel 5 and in high-definition on digital channel 605.

History
The station signed on along with sister station CFJP-TV in Montreal in 1986 as part of what was then the TQS network. It was owned by the family of Jean Pouliot, then-owner of CFCF-TV. The A in the callsign stands for Adélard, Pouliot's middle name.

Originally a full satellite of CFJP, it began airing its own programming on September 3, 1989. However, like all other TQS/V/Noovo stations, it was (and still is) largely a semi-satellite of CFJP. As an owned-and-operated station of the network, CFAP was part of the takeover of TQS by Remstar Corporation.

Digital television
CFAP-DT ceased broadcasting in analogue on August 17, 2011 and signed on to digital on August 27, 2011. Through the use of PSIP, digital television receivers display CFAP-DT's virtual channel as 2.1.

References

External links
 

FAP
FAP
Television channels and stations established in 1986
National Hockey League over-the-air television broadcasters
1986 establishments in Quebec